The Shelby Consolidated School, also known as Shelby-Tenant Community School, is a historic building located in Shelby, Iowa, United States.  The first school in Shelby was organized in 1870.  In 1919 the Consolidated Independent School District of Shelby was created from eight school districts.  This building replaced an 1899 structure on the same site.  It was designed by the Omaha architectural firm of John Latenser & Sons.  It was either designed by, or heavily influenced by, John Latenser Sr.  The brick, three-story, U-shaped Neoclassical-inspired structure is typical of the many "school buildings that made Latenser a highly respected name in school architecture in the early twentieth century."  It is also the only known extant building designed by the firm in Western Iowa.  The facility is a fine example of consolidated school design that state officials, prominent school architects, and education professionals advocated for at the time it was built.  A new gymnasium was added in 1975.  The Shelby-Tenant Community School District was discontinued in 2004, and this building was left vacant.  It was listed on the National Register of Historic Places in 2014, and converted into an apartment building called the Cardinal Lofts.

References

School buildings completed in 1922
Defunct schools in Iowa
Apartment buildings in Iowa
Buildings and structures in Shelby County, Iowa
National Register of Historic Places in Shelby County, Iowa
School buildings on the National Register of Historic Places in Iowa
Neoclassical architecture in Iowa
1922 establishments in Iowa